Sangkum Banh Loloke is a 1970 film directed by Ly Bun Yim. It stars Kong Som Eun and Virak Dara.

Cast 
Kong Som Eun
Virak Dara

References 
 

1970 films
Khmer-language films
Cambodian drama films